Trent Grubb (born 22 March 1989) is a rugby league footballer who played for Cronulla-Sutherland Sharks in the National Rugby League. His choice of position is second row.

References 

Cronulla-Sutherland Sharks players
Australian rugby league players
1989 births
Rugby league second-rows
Living people
Place of birth missing (living people)